Rhyncophoromyia is a genus of flies in the family Phoridae.

Species
R. calvipalpis (Borgmeier, 1967)
R. conica (Malloch, 1912)
R. diversa Prado, 1976
R. gymnopleura Borgmeier, 1926
R. laticosta Borgmeier, 1959
R. maculineura Borgmeier, 1959
R. nearctica Borgmeier, 1963
R. nubilifurca Borgmeier, 1969
R. proboscidea (Malloch, 1912)
R. spinipleura Borgmeier, 1959
R. trivittata Malloch, 1923
R. umbrosa Borgmeier, 1959

References

Phoridae
Platypezoidea genera
Taxa named by John Russell Malloch